Frederick Horsman Varley (January 2, 1881 – September 8, 1969) was a member of the Canadian Group of Seven.

Career

Early life
Varley was born in Sheffield, England, in 1881, the son of Lucy (Barstow) and Samuel James Smith Varley the 7th. He studied art in Sheffield and attended the Académie Royale des Beaux-Arts in Antwerp (1900-1902), Belgium, while he worked on the docks. He immigrated to Canada in 1912 on the advice of another Sheffield native (and future Group of Seven member), Arthur Lismer, and found work at the Grip Ltd. design firm in Toronto, Ontario.

War artist

Beginning in January 1918, he served in the First World War with C.W. Simpson, J.W. Beatty and Maurice Cullen.  Varley came to the attention of Lord Beaverbrook, who arranged for him to be commissioned as an official war artist.  He accompanied Canadian troops in the Hundred Days offensive from Amiens, France to Mons, Belgium.  His paintings of combat are based on his experiences at the front. Although he had been enthusiastic to travel to France as a war artist, he became deeply disturbed by what he saw, saying:

Varley's Some Day the People Will Return, shown at Burlington House in London and at the Canadian War Memorials Exhibition, is a large canvas depicting a war-ravaged cemetery, suggesting that even the dead cannot escape the destruction.

In Varley's painting For What? (1918), a single gravedigger takes a rest from his labours, a cart full of bodies beside him. It is one of the few official Canadian First World War paintings that does not hide the reality of battlefield death in images of ruins, blasted trees, and battle detritus.

Group of Seven

In 1920, he was a founding member of the Group of Seven. He was the only original member of the Group of Seven to specialize in portraiture, but he also painted landscapes. Varley's major contribution to art is his work with the Group of Seven and his portraits.

Later life and death

After living in Ontario for a number of years, Varley moved to Vancouver, BC in 1926 where he became Head of the Department of Drawing and Painting at the School of Decorative and Applied Arts in Vancouver at the invitation of Charles Hepburn Scott. He remained in this position from 1926 until 1933. He left British Columbia in 1936 due to his experiences with depression, and two years later joined fellow artist Terry M. Shortt, the Royal Ontario Museum ornithologist, on a trip to the Arctic in 1938. In 1954, along with a handful of artists including Eric Aldwinckle, he visited the Soviet Union on the first cultural exchange of the Cold War.

He died in Toronto in 1969 and was buried alongside other members of the Original Seven at the McMichael Canadian Art Collection grounds in Kleinburg, Ontario.

Recognition
Varley was an associate member of the Royal Canadian Academy of Arts.

In Unionville, the Varley Art Gallery of Markham is named after him, as is Fred Varley Drive, a two-lane residential street. Varley lived nearby at the Salem-Eckhardt House from 1952 to 1969.

On 6 May 1994 Canada Post issued 'Vera (detail), F.H. Varley, 1931' in the Masterpieces of Canadian art series. The stamp was designed by Pierre-Yves Pelletier based on an oil painting Vera, (1931) by Frederick Horsman Varley in the National Gallery of Canada, Ottawa, Ontario. The 88¢ stamps are perforated 14 x 14.5 mm and were printed by Leigh-Mardon Pty Limited.

His place in the art history of Canada is verified by the government's decision to reproduce his self-portrait as a 17-cent postage stamp. On 22 May 1981 Canada Post issued 'Frederick H. Varley, Self Portrait' designed by Pierre Fontaine. The stamps are based on an oil painting Self Portrait, (circa 1945) by Frederick Horsman Varley in the Hart House Permanent Collection, University of Toronto, Toronto, Ontario. The 17¢ stamps are perforated 12.5 mm and were printed by Ashton-Potter Limited.

Varley has been designated as an Historic Person in the Directory of Federal Heritage Designations.

Selected works

See also
 Canadian official war artists
 Group of Seven
 Tom Thomson
 War art
 War artist

Notes

Bibliography 
 
 
 Brandon, Laura. (2008).  Art and War. New York: I.B. Tauris. ;   OCLC 225345535
Brandon, Laura. (2021). War Art in Canada: A Critical History. Toronto: Art Canada Institute, 2021. ISBN 978-1-4871-0271-5.
 Davis, Ann (1992). The logic of ecstasy: Canadian mystical painting, 1920–1940. Toronto: University of Toronto Press. ; ;  OCLC 26256269
 Reid, Dennis R. (1988). A Concise History of Canadian Painting. Toronto: Oxford University Press. ; ;   OCLC 18378555

External links

 
 Biography at the Tom Thomson Memorial Art Gallery
 Frederick Varley at artcyclopedia.com
 CBC Digital Archives - The Group of Seven: Painters in the Wilderness
 Watch the NFB documentary Varley

1881 births
1969 deaths
19th-century Canadian painters
Canadian male painters
19th-century English painters
20th-century Canadian painters
20th-century English painters
Artists from Sheffield
Canadian portrait painters
Canadian war artists
English male painters
Group of Seven (artists)
Members of the Royal Canadian Academy of Arts
Persons of National Historic Significance (Canada)
World War I artists
20th-century English male artists
19th-century English male artists
19th-century Canadian male artists
20th-century Canadian male artists
British emigrants to Canada